Rosemarie Zagarri is  distinguished  American historian who specializes in the study of the Early American political history, women's and gender history, and global history. She is University Professor and Professor of History at George Mason University in Fairfax, VA. The recipient of numerous grants, awards, and national recognitions, she was President of the Society for Historians of the Early American Republic from 2009 to 2010.

Life 
Zagarri grew up in St. Louis, Missouri, the eldest of six children. 
She was married to the writer Jefferson Morley from 1985-1994 and to Professor William T. Gormley, Jr. of Georgetown University from 1998 to the present. She has two children.

Career 

Zagarri received her Ph.D. from Yale University where she was the last doctoral student of the eminent early American historian, Edmund S. Morgan.  She was an Assistant Professor of History at West Virginia University from 1984-1987; and Assistant and Associate Professor (with tenure) of History at the Catholic University of America from 1987-1994; and Associate Professor and Professor of History at George Mason University from 1997-2013. In 2013, she was appointed University Professor of History, the highest faculty rank at GMU. 
She is the author of The Politics of Size: Representation in the United States, 1776-1850 (Cornell University Press, 1987), A Woman’s Dilemma: Mercy Otis Warren and the American Revolution (Harlan Davidson, 1995; 2nd. ed., WileyBlackwell, 2015), and Revolutionary Backlash: Women and Politics in the Early American Republic (University of Pennsylvania Press,  Fall 2007),  and is the editor of David Humphreys’ “Life of General Washington” with George’ Washington’s “Remarks” (University of George Press, 1991; ppb. 2006). She has received fellowships from the National Endowment for the Humanities (1997-1998, 2011-2012), the American Antiquarian Society, and the American Philosophical Society. Her scholarly articles have appeared in the Journal of American History, American Quarterly, the Journal of the Early Republic, and the William & Mary Quarterly, and in numerous edited collections of essays. I

Distinctions 
In 1992, Zagarri received the Outstanding Article Prize, awarded by the Southeastern Eighteenth-Century Studies Association, for “Morals, Manners, and the Republican Mother.” In Spring 1993, the Fulbright Commission appointed her to the Thomas Jefferson Chair in American Studies at the University of Amsterdam in the Netherlands. She has served on the editorial boards of American Quarterly, The Journal of the Early Republic, The William & Mary Quarterly, and the University of Virginia Press and was a member of the Council of the Omohundro Institute of Early American History and Culture. She has appeared as an on-camera historian on CSPAN’s Book TV, CSPAN's "Morning Journal," PBS’s  “George Washington: The Man who Wouldn’t Be King,” and the Fairfax Television Network’s “The Real Martha Washington.”  In 2009 she was elected President of the Society for Historians of the Early American Republic (SHEAR). In  2011, she received the  Scholarship Award from GMU's College of Humanities and Social Sciences and was appointed a Distinguished Lecturer by the Organization of American Historians.  She was appointed University Professor in 2013.

She is a member of the Organization of American Historians.

Bibliography 

Some of her books are:

 Revolutionary Backlash: Women and Politics in the Early American Republic Philadelphia University of Pennsylvania Press, 2011,  
 A Woman's Dilemma: Mercy Otis Warren and the American Revolution  John Wiley & Sons Inc., 2015,  
 The Politics of Size: Representation in the United States, 1776 1850 , Ithaca, N.Y.: Cornell University Press, 2010,  
 Edmund S Morgan; Rosemarie Zagarri; Joseph J Ellis The Birth of the Republic, 1763-89  Chicago: University of Chicago Press, 2013. , 
 Life of General Washington

References

External links
 
 

1957 births
Living people
21st-century American historians
Yale Graduate School of Arts and Sciences alumni
George Mason University faculty
American women historians